Redd is a surname. Notable people with the surname include:

Chris Redd (born 1985), American stand-up comedian and actor
Chuck Redd (21st century), American drummer
Dana Redd (born 1968), American politician
Freddie Redd (1928–2021), American pianist
Glen Redd (born 1958), American football player
Henry Redd (20th century), American football coach
James Redd (21st century), American football coach
Jasper Redd (21st century), American comedian
Jeff Redd (21st century), American singer
John Scott Redd (born 1944), United States Navy admiral
Lambert Redd (1908–1986), American athlete
Marie Redd (21st century), American politician
Michael Redd (born 1979), American basketball player
Nancy Redd (born 1981), American model
Sharon Redd (1945–1992), American singer
Shawty Redd (21st century), American record producer
Veronica Redd (born 1948), American actress
Vince Redd (born 1985), American football player
William Redd, also known as Si Redd (1911-2003), American businessman and philanthropist
Wilmot Redd (17th century), American woman executed at the Salem witch trials

See also
Redd (disambiguation)
Redd (given name)
Read (surname)
Red (nickname)